The Mayor of Kansas City, Missouri is the highest official in the Kansas City, Missouri Municipal Government.

Since the 1920s the city has had a council-manager government in which a city manager runs most of the day-to-day operations of the city. Unlike most cities of its size, by charter Kansas City has a "weak-mayor" system, in which most of the power is formally vested in the city council. However, the mayor is very influential in drafting and guiding public policy. The mayor presides over all city council meetings and has a casting vote on the council. Due to these combined factors the mayor, in fact, holds a significant amount of de facto power in the city government.

Since 1946 mayors of Kansas City are elected by the voters of Kansas City to four-year terms, and are limited to two terms under the city's charter. Mayors initially served one-year terms until 1890 when they began serving two-year terms. According to the City Charter, city elections are non-partisan, meaning that the mayor and city council run without nominal political affiliation. The mayor of Kansas City occupies an office on the 29th floor of the Kansas City City Hall, the building's highest floor. Eleven of Kansas City's mayors are interred in Elmwood Cemetery. The current mayor of Kansas City is Quinton Lucas, who was elected in 2019.

Mayors

Notes 

 A.  45 people have served as mayor, three twice; the table includes these non-consecutive terms as well.
 B.  The fractional terms of some mayors are not to be understood absolutely literally; rather, they are meant to show single terms during which multiple mayors served, due to resignations, deaths and the like.
 C.  Johnson resigned after only 35 days in office.
 D.  Per the new city charter, Holmes was the first mayor to serve a two-year term.
 E.  Died in office.
 F.  Smith resigned from office.
 G.  Kemp served one two-year term, one three-year term, and one four-year term.

See also
List of mayors of Kansas City, Kansas
 Timeline of Kansas City, Missouri

References 
General

 
 

Charters

  
 

Specific

External links 
 Political graveyard list of mayors
 Kansas City Star list of mayors
 Kansas City mayor's office
 Kansas City Public Library mayor history

Kansas City
Government of Kansas City, Missouri
Mayors of Kansas City